Hippocrepis biflora is a species of annual herb in the family Fabaceae. Individuals can grow to 17 cm tall.

Sources

References 

biflora
Flora of Malta